The 2003–04 Spartan South Midlands Football League season is the 7th in the history of Spartan South Midlands Football League a football competition in England.

Premier Division

The Premier Division featured 17 clubs which competed in the division last season, along with two clubs, promoted from Division One:
Harpenden Town
Leverstock Green

League table

Division One

Division One featured 16 clubs which competed in the division last season, along with two new clubs:
Buckingham Athletic, promoted from Division Two
Sun Postal Sports, joined from the Herts County League

League table

Division Two

Division Two featured 13 clubs which competed in the division last season, along with four new clubs:
Arlesey Athletic, new club
Kentish Town
Markyate
Risborough Rangers, relegated from Division One

Also, Padbury United changed name to Padbury B T F C.

League table

References

External links
 FCHD Spartan South Midlands Football League page

2003–04
2003–04 in English football leagues